C11orf98 is a protein-encoding gene on chromosome 11 in humans of unknown function. It is otherwise known as c11orf48. The gene spans the chromosomal locus from 62,662,817-62,665,210. There are 4 exons. It spans across 2,394 base pairs of DNA and produces an mRNA that is 646 base pairs long.

Gene

Expression 
This gene is expressed at a very high level,4.4 times the average gene. The c11orf98 protein is expressed in a wide array of tissues. RNA-seq dat showed this gene to be expressed highest in the appendix, lymph node, and thymus.

An analysis via PSORT II concluded that the C11orf98 gene product is localized to the nucleus 82.6% reliability. This nuclear localization suggests that C11orf98 protein may have a function related to the expression and regulation of genes in the nucleus.

Regulation 
Several different transcription factors are predicted to regulate the expression of the c11orf98 gene. These transcription factors were predicted based on DNA sequences found in the gene using Genomatix which also provided the name and description.

Protein 
The c11orf98 gene encodes a protein that is 123 amino acids long. The predicted molecular weight of the protein is 14.2 kDa. The basal isoelectric point was determined to be 11.53. The protein's subcellular localization was predicted to be in the nucleus.

Domain 
The c11orf98 protein contains a region of unknown function (DUF5564) that spans from amino acids 1-98. There are also 2 disordered regions within the protein that span from amino acids 1-21 and 32-123. C11orf98 contains 4 bipartite nuclear localization signals (NLS_BP) which indicates the protein will be 'tagged' for import into the cell nucleus by nuclear transport. The NLS_BP sequence usually consists of positively charged arginines, which would also explain the arginine rich region (ARG_RICH).

Structure 
The secondary structures of the c11orf98 protein was predicted to have multiple alpha helices as well as beta sheets. The tertiary structure was predicted using AlphaFold

Post-translational Modifications 
C11orf98 protein undergoes modifications following translation. The c11orf98 protein was predicted to have an amidation site. This functions as an active peptide precursor cleavage site. Next, a cAMP- and cGMP-dependent protein kinase phosphorylation site  was predicted as well as other phosphorylation sites such as a Casein kinase II phosphorylation site and a protein kinase C phosphorylation site . An N-myristoylation site was predicted as well. Phosphorylation is significant because a phosphoryl group is added to the site, which only can occur in the nucleus or in cytosol. Myristoylation is significant because a myristoyl group (fatty acid group) is added to the site which helps anchor the transmembrane protein or cytosolic protein to the membrane. There were twelve predicted o-beta-GlcNAc glycosylation sites. This is significant because this modification is exclusively found on nuclear and cytoplasmic proteins rather than membrane proteins and secretory proteins. One sumoylation site was predicted. Sumoylation is a post-translational modification involved in nuclear-cytosolic transport, transcriptional regulation, apoptosis, protein stability, response to stress, and progression through the cell cycle.

Interactions

Homology and evolution

Orthologs 
The c11orf98 gene has 148 orthologs. The oldest ortholog appeared in invertebrates. Other orthologs were found in birds, reptiles, amphibians, fish, and invertebrates.

Evolution rate 
The relative evolution rate for c11orf98 is slower than the rate of fibrinogen alpha, but faster than cytochrome c. This is shown on the graph on the right

Phylogenetic tree 

On the right is a phylogenetic tree displaying the evolutionary history of the gene.

Clinical significance 
Currently, the c11orf98 gene is not associated with any disease or medical condition.

References